ZF AS Tronic is an automated manual transmission made by ZF Friedrichshafen for the motorcoach and lorry market in Europe and North America which was first introduced in 2003.
As a part of manual transmission, it lacks the torque converter that is standard on automatic transmissions-an AS Tronic has been quoted as being 500 pounds less than the B500. Some coach operators are choosing this transmission for better fuel economy over automatics.

This transmission is offered as 6-speed(called AS Tronic Lite by ZF), 10-speed 12-speed or 16-speed transmission.

References

External links

AS Tronic